Kamalabad may refer to:

Alborz Province
 Kamalabad, former name of Kamal Shahr, a city in Alborz Province, Iran
 Kamalabad Rural District, an administrative subdivision of Alborz Province, Iran

Ardabil Province
 Kamalabad, Ardabil, a village in Nir County

Fars Province
Kamalabad, Arsanjan, a village in Arsanjan County
Kamalabad, Fasa, a village in Fasa County
Kamalabad, Firuzabad, a village in Firuzabad County
Kamalabad, Larestan, a village in Larestan County
Kamalabad, Sarvestan, a village in Sarvestan County
Kamalabad, Sepidan, a village in Sepidan County

Golestan Province
Kamalabad, Galikash, a village in Galikash County
Kamalabad, Gorgan, a village in Gorgan County

Isfahan Province
 Kamalabad, Isfahan, a village in Isfahan County
 Kamalabad, Nain, a village in Nain County

Kerman Province
 Kamalabad, Baft, a village in Baft County
 Kamalabad, Rafsanjan, a village in Rafsanjan County

Kermanshah Province
 Kamalabad, Kermanshah, a village in Kermanshah County

Kohgiluyeh and Boyer-Ahmad Province
 Kamalabad, Kohgiluyeh and Boyer-Ahmad

Kurdistan Province
 Kamalabad, Kurdistan, a village in Qorveh County

Markazi Province
 Kamalabad-e Bala, a village in Arak County
 Kamalabad-e Pain, a village in Arak County

North Khorasan Province
 Kamalabad, North Khorasan, a village in Faruj County

Qazvin Province
 Kamalabad, Alborz, a village in Alborz County
 Kamalabad, Qazvin, a village in Qazvin County

Razavi Khorasan Province
 Kamalabad, Razavi Khorasan, a village in Chenaran County

Sistan and Baluchestan Province

West Azerbaijan Province
 Kamalabad, West Azerbaijan, a village in Chaypareh County

Yazd Province
 Kamalabad, Yazd, a village in Saduq County

See also
 Kamelabad (disambiguation)